Giovanni Battista Busiri or Bussini (Rome, 1698 – August 28, 1757) was an Italian painter, mainly of landscapes and vedute.

Biography
He followed the style of Gaspard Poussin. He was influenced by Jan Frans van Bloemen, Hendrik Frans van Lint, Andrea Locatelli, and Nicolas Poussin.

Notes
Giovanni Battista Busiri: Vedutista Romano Del '700 by Andrea Busiri Vici, Bozzi, 1966.
Uvedale Price (1747-1829): Decoding the Picturesque, by C. Watkins, Ben Cowell, 2012.

References

Giovanni Battista Busiri on Artnet

1698 births
1757 deaths
18th-century Italian painters
Italian male painters
Italian landscape painters
18th-century Italian male artists